Remyella may refer to:
 Remyella (beetle), a genus of beetles in the family Leiodidae
 Remyella (plant), a genus of mosses in the family Brachytheciaceae